Chlorellaceae are a family of green algae in the order Chlorellales.

This genus includes some important emerging pathogens of humans and farm animals, such as Prototheca zopfii.

References

External links

 
Trebouxiophyceae families